Gaylord High School (GHS) is a public secondary school in Gaylord, Michigan. It serves grades 9-12 for Gaylord Community Schools. As of 2015, the principal is Chris Hodges.

Academics
The school offers multiple Advanced Placement classes including AP English, AP American History, AP Government, AP World History, AP Biology, and AP Calculus.

Demographics 
The demographic breakdown of the 1,025 students enrolled in 2018-19 was:

 Male - 49.9%
 Female - 50.1%
 Native American - 1.1%
 Asian - 0.7%
 Black - 1.0%
 Hispanic - 24.4%
 White - 93.4%
 Multiracial - 1.5%

In addition, 44.9% of students were eligible for reduced-price or free lunch.

Athletics
Gaylord's Blue Devils participate in the Big North Athletic Conference. Its school colors are blue and gold. The following Michigan High School Athletic Association (MHSAA) sanctioned sports are offered:

Baseball (boys) 
Basketball (girls and boys) 
Bowling (girls and boys) 
Competitive cheerleading (girls) 
Cross country (girls and boys) 
Football (boys) 
Golf (boys) 
Ice hockey (boys) 
Skiing (girls and boys) 
Soccer (girls and boys) 
Softball (girls)
Swim and dive (girls) 
Track and field (girls and boys) 
Volleyball (girls) 
Wrestling (boys)

Notable alumni
Claude E. Shannon - mathematician, electrical engineer, father of Information Theory

References

External links

Public high schools in Michigan
Schools in Otsego County, Michigan